HMS Shearwater was a  sloop of the Royal Navy.

Shearwater was laid down at J. Samuel White, Cowes on 15 August 1938.  She was launched on 18 April 1939 and commissioned on 7 September 1939.  She served during the Second World War and was adopted by Farnborough Urban District Council during Warship Week in 1942.

She survived the war and sold for scrapping on 21 April 1947.  She was broken up by Stockton Ship & Salvage Company.

She was the fictional HMS Winger in Nicholas Monsarrat's book 'Corvette Command' of the Three Corvettes series.  This vessel was also the very first sloop to be commanded by an RNVR officer from June 1944 until July 1945, Desmond Henry Cope, DSC(1943).

References

Bibliography

 
 
  Monsarrat, Nicholas, Corvette Command, Cassell, 1944

External links
 HMS Shearwater at Uboat.net

Kingfisher-class sloops
Sloops of the Royal Navy
1939 ships